Tunis Business School is the first public English-language business school in Tunisia. It is based in El Mourouj in the Ben Arous Governorate. It follows the Anglo-Saxon business curriculum and it is open to the holders of the baccalaureate in the branches of mathematics, experimental sciences, computer science and economics & management. The new institution will deliver Bachelor of Science degrees in Business Administration (B.Sc.B.A.) and Master of Science degrees. Tunis Business School opened on 4 October 2010. In the first phase it will incorporate around 700 students and later the number will increase to reach 7500 in the following years. The cost of establishing this business school is TND 15.4 million. It covers an area of 3 hectares, including an administration building, a restaurant and library.

Establishment
Officially established on 25 October 2010 (decree number 2755 of 25 October 2010), Tunis Business School is the first public business institution in Tunisia using English as the language of instruction and following an American approach to higher education.

Curriculum
Students at TBS will be earning a Bachelor of Science in Business Administration (BSBA). In order to receive the degree, students must earn a minimum of 125 acceptable semester credits. At different levels of the curriculum, the students have to make choices and shape their own profiles. The student should take about 46 courses, corresponding to 123 credits, consisting of 17 Business Core Requirements, 11 courses from the Business requirements for the Major, 5 courses of Business electives for the Minor, 7 courses of nonbusiness requirements, and 4 computer science courses.

Specialties
From among Accounting, Business Analytics, Finance, Information Technology, International Business Economy, and Marketing, students must choose an area of emphasis as a Major and another area with less emphasis as a Minor. The Major consists of 30 semester credits beyond business core courses and a 3-credit Senior Project course.
Besides, There are currently three master's degrees at Tunis Business School, a Master of Science in Business Analytics, a Professional Master in the Management of NGOs, and a Professional Master in Fintech.

Enrolment
To enroll in the Bachelor of Science Business Administration program at Tunis Business School, Baccalaureate graduates need to sit for an entrance exam in English. In addition, prospective students need to demonstrate good knowledge of Mathematics.

See also 
 Tunis Business School Alumni Association
 List of business schools in Africa
 List of Arab universities
 List of colleges and universities
 Mediterranean School of Business
 Education in Tunisia

References 

Business schools in Africa
Educational institutions established in 2010
2010 establishments in Tunisia